The 2020 Internazionali di Tennis Città di Forlì was a professional tennis tournament played on clay courts. It was the first edition of the tournament which was part of the 2020 ATP Challenger Tour. It took place in Forlì, Italy between 21 and 27 September 2020.

Singles main-draw entrants

Seeds

 1 Rankings as of 14 September 2020.

Other entrants
The following players received wildcards into the singles main draw:
  Salvatore Caruso
  Lorenzo Musetti
  Frances Tiafoe

The following players received entry from the qualifying draw:
  Christian Harrison
  Thiago Monteiro
  Nikolás Sánchez Izquierdo
  Giulio Zeppieri

The following player received entry as a lucky loser:
  Alexander Ritschard

Champions

Singles

 Lorenzo Musetti def.  Thiago Monteiro 7–6(7–2), 7–6(7–5).

Doubles

 Tomislav Brkić /  Nikola Ćaćić def.  Andrey Golubev /  Andrea Vavassori 3–6, 7–5, [10–3].

References

Internazionali di Tennis Città di Forlì
Internazionali di Tennis Città di Forlì
September 2020 sports events in Italy
Internazionali di Tennis Città di Forlì